The CKY video series is a series of videos produced by Bam Margera and Brandon DiCamillo and other residents of West Chester, Pennsylvania. "CKY" stands for "Camp Kill Yourself".  The series was part of the basis for what eventually became Jackass.

Four videos were released, Landspeed presents: CKY (later called CKY), CKY2K, CKY3, and CKY4: The Latest & Greatest. There is also a CKY documentary DVD, which is a supplemental item in the CKY Box Set, as well as two CKY Trilogy sets, both of which are compilation DVDs featuring scenes from the previous CKY DVDs. The videos were named after Bam Margera's brother Jess and his band CKY.

The videos feature Bam Margera, Brandon DiCamillo, their friends, and Margera's relatives performing various stunts and pranks, interspersed with skate footage of Margera and other professional skateboarders. A trademark of the skating footage was to show unsuccessful trick attempts immediately followed by the same skater pulling the trick off. CKY started when Margera and his friends were in the same graphics arts class at school in West Chester, Pennsylvania. During class, they would go out to a field and film skits, eventually being compiled into the CKY series. In a 2002 interview, Margera said that more than 400,000 copies of the series have been sold.

In 2018, producer Joe Frantz confirmed that he had begun remastering all four videos for HD release. They were released in 2019 on the now-defunct streaming service DCTV.

The CKY crew 

In addition to Margera and DiCamillo, the core members of the CKY crew included Margera's brother Jess, Ryan Dunn, Chris Raab (Raab Himself), and Rake Yohn. Jess's involvement with the video side of CKY became increasingly limited as CKY the band became popular, and touring and recording commitments took up most of his time.

The first video stars the crew as well as The Gill (Ryan Gee), Mike Maldonado, Chris Aspite a.k.a. Hoofbite, and Kerry Getz. Bam's father, Phil Margera, was also featured (uncredited) in the first video. Bam's ex-girlfriend Jenn Rivell and David Decurtis aka Naked Dave starred in the second video, which also features Bam's mother April Margera (uncredited). Chris Raab was called Raab Himself in the third video, which also featured CKY band members Deron Miller and Chad Ginsburg as well as Tony Hawk and Brandon Novak. Bam's uncle Vincent Margera aka "Don Vito" starred in the fourth video. Jenn Rivell's daughter is also seen in some clips.

The CKY videos brought Bam and his friends to the attention of Jeff Tremaine who drafted them into the cast of Jackass which aired for three seasons on MTV. Most Jackass skits featuring the CKY crew were lifted from previously released CKY material or were recorded by the crew in West Chester, while the Los Angeles-based faction of the Jackass team featuring Johnny Knoxville, Wee Man, Chris Pontius and others recorded in California. A subsequent MTV spin-off entitled Viva La Bam followed Bam Margera and his crew as they tortured Bam's family and generally wreaked havoc in West Chester and around the world. Another spin-off, titled Bam's Unholy Union, featured Bam planning his wedding with some of the CKY crew members.

CKY 

Landspeed presents: CKY, the first film in the series, was released on March 1, 1999. The name Landspeed comes from Landspeed Wheels, the wheel company created by Rob Erickson and distributed by Tod Swank through Tum Yeto Inc. Landspeed made skateboard wheels and clothing from 1998 to 2000. The name CKY comes from Jess Margera's band. The video shows a mixed up variety of random, homemade, crazy humor, and mostly focuses on stunts, pranks, and crazy behavior, as well as skateboarding. The music features original songs by the band CKY, including "96 Quite Bitter Beings".

Differences between the VHS and DVD versions 

The copyright was taken off because it has Tum Yeto references.
In the opening credits, the Landspeed title was taken off.
A scene was also removed. It featured Brandon DiCamillo running around a Christmas parade as Santa Claus, because the real Santa was late. No one at the parade except for Bam and his crew knew that Brandon wasn't involved with the parade.
 In the Round 1 version of CKY, there are clips removed, not only the Santa clip, but things such as bits and pieces and extended skits, and to make up for that it has more extra footage at the end than before.
Some skits in the DVD version are edited or cut short. Such as, Bam sings two Bon Jovi songs in the street to strangers in the VHS version (they cut one of them in the DVD version).

CKY Documentary 
CKY Documentary is a compilation of footage from the first CKY video. It is in a double pack on the CKY Trilogy Round One DVD and CKY the box set (quadruple pack) DVD and show profiles of each member of the CKY crew, including some older skits from when Bam Margera was in high school and the story of how CKY was created. It is entirely in black and white.

CKY2K 

CKY2K, the second film in the series, was released on May 22, 2000. The video features a trip to Iceland, the rental car, a baseball game, "Bran's Freestyle", and other random items. The music features early versions of Flesh into Gear and Sporadic Movement by CKY; as well as many other artists, including an opening scene with Rammstein, Iceland scenes with Björk and Orbital, and a skateboarding scene with Believer "Dies Irae (Day of Wrath)" and Aphex Twin.

Near the end of the video, there is a scene in which a minor exposes his genitalia in front of a public restaurant. The video explained that "this is what happens when you tell Bam you'll do anything to be in CKY." In 2003, the parents of the minor sued. During the hearing, a County Court Judge ruled that images of the plaintiff "must be deleted from future versions" of the video. Subsequently, CKY2K was discontinued due (in part) to copyright issues. The first major issue was from Björk.

Iceland 
The video was notable for the documentary of their trip to Iceland. The music features "Hyperballad" by Björk where Bam Margera and the crew hang out on the top of a mountain with gorgeous views from the top.

As they stayed in a hotel somewhere in Iceland (the hotel at the airport), Brandon DiCamillo smeared feces on Ryan Dunn while he was sleeping on the bed. Smeared with feces, Dunn fought back by urinating on DiCamillo sleeping on the floor. Later, they argued in the car about the incident.

The crew does a variety of stunts, including guys riding on furniture on the road as a sled, featuring music by Orbital playing "Halcyon + On + On". Later, Bam was outside Björk's house calling her.

The rental car 

Bam drives a Chevrolet Cavalier after paying $9 for extra insurance. With the car, Bam Margera attempts crazy reckless driving maneuvers, knocking over orange cones and skidding turns. The next day, Rake Yohn finished off the already damaged car by setting fire to the radio, which completely burned the entire car. The music features an early version of "Sporadic movement" by the band CKY.

Differences between the VHS and DVD versions 
 The warnings were taken off from the beginning of the VHS version, and used in the beginning of the DVD menu, which then shows Bam playing with HIM.
 A small note at the end of "Bran's Freestyle" by CKY, and featured some clips after the credits, showing Bam Margera filming for seven teen sips, which includes a short preview of his film at the very end of the video. In the DVD version, the end credits were cut short and instead played "One Last Time" by HIM and featured alternate footage, including more furniture sledding and Bam commanding his father Phil to do push-ups.

CKY3 

CKY3, the third film in the series, was released in 2001. Soon after its release, Margera and DiCamillo were sued over the fight scene involving Mike Vallely. The issue was settled out of court in 2006. It was also the first of the videos to be taken off the market due to copyright restrictions. Some of the musicians (or their legal representation) were unhappy with Margera using their music without their permission. This would later happen with CKY2K and the box set including all three videos and the documentary.

CKY4: The Latest & Greatest 

CKY 4, the fourth and final film in the series, was released on November 10, 2002. It has a marked improvement in editing techniques compared to the other films, mostly due to Bam Margera's newly acquired wealth and ability to purchase motion picture film cameras and use advanced post-production facilities. However, it also features a lot of older video material, some unseen, some extended and some off-cuts from previous CKY films. Scenes include Don Vito's "50 Shots of Peach Schnapps" (bonus feature) and Ryan Dunn rolling off a roof in a barrel.

CKY4 is the only CKY video to be censored, and one of the few DVDs to have been censored three times.
A DVD Easter egg showed Bam Margera and his then-girlfriend mid-coitus with altered color mixes to avoid nudity. This wasn't the first time CKY videos had attracted trouble of this sort, but none of the previous videos cut legal sexually themed scenes until this one, in mid-2003. The scene is only available on the first 5,000 copies.
In 2002, Brandon DiCamillo and CKY drummer Jess Margera wrote a rap about Masters of the Universe characters Skeletor and Beast Man engaging in extreme homosexual behavior, called Skeletor vs Beastman. Mattel, owners of the Masters of the Universe franchise, heard about the rap, and were displeased. Margera was sent a cease-and-desist order, and subsequent editions of the DVD have replaced this video with skateboarding footage.
CKY guitarist Chad I Ginsburg, a fan of punk rocker G.G. Allin, visited his grave one day and after consuming an entire bottle of Jim Beam bourbon (Allin's favorite beverage), he proceeded to urinate on the grave and left an autographed copy of Infiltrate.Destroy.Rebuild., which was later stolen. Mixed in between the grave footage is CKY performing Allin's song "Bite It, You Scum".
At the end of the "lil key key" Chris Raab's skit, there was an Easter egg that was also cut in 2003 for unknown reasons.

CKY: The Greatest Hits 

On November 2, 2014, MTV premiered a special in dedication of the CKY videos, featuring new interviews of the crew, as well as unreleased footage documenting the series as a whole. The special was directed by former CKY cinematographer Joe Frantz.

High definition re-releases 

Joe Frantz announced on a 2011 episode of Radio Bam that he was set to remaster the CKY series in HD. He stated the same will be done with Haggard: The Movie and Minghags. On January 19, 2014, Frantz gave an update on the project via his Facebook page, stating:
On December 2, 2018, Frantz gave an official update on the project, stating that production is now underway. The remasters released from March 14 to April 25 on the now-defunct streaming service DCTV. On May 15, 2021, Frantz announced on his Instagram and Twitter accounts that he will be uploading the HD re-releases for free on YouTube.

See also 
 CKY (band)
Jackass
Viva La Bam
Radio Bam
Homewrecker
Bam's Unholy Union
Bam's World Domination
Bam's Bad Ass Game Show

References

External links 

American independent films
CKY
Jackass (TV series)
Comedy film series
Practical jokes
2000s English-language films
1990s English-language films
Stunt television series
1990s American films
2000s American films